David Jewett Baker (September 7, 1792August 6, 1869) was an American politician in the U.S. state of Illinois. He briefly served as a U.S. Senator in 1830.

Early life
Baker was born in East Haddam, Connecticut, the son of Joanna (Minor) and Bayze Baker, and moved with his parents to Ontario County, New York as a child. He attended the common schools and in 1816 he graduated from Hamilton College in Clinton, New York. He studied law and was admitted to the Illinois bar in 1819. The first place he practiced law was Kaskaskia, Illinois.

Political career
He served in various political positions in Illinois, and was probate judge of Randolph County from August 1827 to December 6, 1830 when he resigned to become a Senator. Baker was appointed as a Democrat to the U.S. Senate to fill the vacancy caused by the death of John McLean and served from November 12, 1830 to December 11, 1830, when a successor was elected and qualified. He thus is one of only a few people who have served in congress for less than a month.

Baker was not a candidate for election in 1830 to fill the vacancy, and was appointed United States Attorney for the district of Illinois in 1833 and served until 1841. He resumed the practice of law, and died in Alton, and was interred in City Cemetery.

References

External links

1792 births
1869 deaths
People from East Haddam, Connecticut
Illinois Democrats
Illinois lawyers
Illinois state court judges
People from Kaskaskia, Illinois
People from Alton, Illinois
Hamilton College (New York) alumni
Democratic Party United States senators from Illinois
19th-century American politicians
19th-century American judges
19th-century American lawyers